The 48th Annual TV Week Logie Awards was held on Sunday 7 May 2006 at the Crown Palladium in Melbourne, and broadcast on the Nine Network. The ceremony was hosted by Bert Newton, Ray Martin, Daryl Somers, Lisa McCune and Georgie Parker. The nominations were announced at the 50 Years of Television Exhibition at the Powerhouse Museum in Sydney on 3 April 2006. In an historic first, the public then voted for their choice of the eight nominees (instead of five) for the Gold Logie via SMS or a 1900 number, right up until the awards night. Special guests included Chris Noth, George Eads and Joan Rivers.

Winners and nominees
In the tables below, winners are listed first and highlighted in bold.

Gold Logie

Acting/Presenting

Most Popular Programs

Most Outstanding Programs

Performers
Pink
David Campbell
Chris Lilley (as Ricky Wong) with Cathy Freeman
Sherbet
Cirque du Soleil
Bert Newton (Tribute to Graham Kennedy)

Hall of Fame
Play School became the 23rd induction into the TV Week Logies Hall of Fame (the third television programme to do so).

References

External links
 

2006
2006 television awards
2006 in Australian television
2006 awards in Australia